Malo Konjari is a village in Municipality of Prilep, North Macedonia. The village has a sports airfield build whilst the village was part of Yugoslavia.

Demographics
According to the 2002 census, the village had a total of 727 inhabitants. Ethnic groups in the village include:

Macedonians 723
Serbs 2
Others 2

Sports
Local football club FK Mlekar plays in the OFS Prilep Division B.

References

Villages in Prilep Municipality